The T-54 and T-55 tanks are a series of Soviet main battle tanks introduced in the years following the Second World War. The first T-54 prototype was completed at Nizhny Tagil by the end of 1945. From the late 1950s, the T-54 eventually became the main tank for armoured units of the Soviet Army, armies of the Warsaw Pact countries, and many others. T-54s and T-55s have been involved in many of the world's armed conflicts since their introduction in the second half of the 20th century. 

The T-54/55 series is the most-produced tank in history. Estimated production numbers for the series range from 96,500 to 100,000. They were replaced by the T-62, T-64, T-72, T-80 and T-90 tanks in the Soviet and Russian armies, but remain in use by up to 50 other armies worldwide, some having received sophisticated retrofitting.

During the Cold War, Soviet tanks never directly faced their NATO adversaries in combat in Europe. However, the T-54/55's first appearance in the West around the period of the 1950s (then the beginning of the Cold War) spurred the United Kingdom to develop a new tank gun, the Royal Ordnance L7, and the United States to develop the M60 tank.

Development history

Predecessors: T-34 and T-44

The Soviet T-34 medium tank of the 1940s is considered to have the best balance of firepower (F-34 tank gun 76.2 mm gun), protection and mobility for its cost of any tank of its time in the world. Its development never stopped throughout the Second World War and it continued to perform well; however, the designers could not incorporate the latest technologies or major developments as vital tank production could not be interrupted during wartime.

In 1943, the Morozov Design Bureau resurrected the pre-war T-34M development project and created the T-44 tank. Thanks to a space-efficient torsion-bar suspension, a novel transverse engine mount, and the removal of the hull machine-gunner's crew position, the T-44 had cross country performance at least as good as the T-34, but with substantially superior armour and a much more powerful 85 mm gun.

By the time the T-44 was ready for production, the T-34 had also been modified to fit the same gun. Although the T-44 was superior in most other ways, by this time T-34 production was in full swing and the massive numbers of T-34s being built offset any advantage to smaller numbers of a superior design. The T-44 was produced in only small numbers, around 2,000 being completed during the war. Instead, the designers continued to use the design as the basis for further improved guns, experimenting with a 122 mm design, but later deciding a 100 mm gun was a better alternative.

Prototypes

Efforts to fit the 100 mm gun to the T-44 demonstrated that small changes to the design would greatly improve the combination. The main issue was a larger turret ring, which suggested slightly enlarging the hull. A prototype of the new design, about  longer and only 10 cm wider, was completed in 1945. This model looked almost identical to the original T-44, albeit with a much larger gun.

In testing, there were several drawbacks that needed correcting and many alterations that had to be made to the vehicle's design. It was decided to begin serial production of the new vehicle and the vehicle officially entered service in April 1946. It would go into production in Nizhny Tagil in 1947 and Kharkiv in 1948.

T-54

Production of the initial series of T-54s began slowly as 1,490 modifications were made. The Red Army received a tank that was superior to World War II designs and theoretically better than the newest tanks of potential opponents. The 100 mm gun fired BR-412 series full-calibre APHE ammunition, which had superior penetration ability when compared to the T-34 that it replaced.

The serial production version, designated T-54-1, differed from the second T-54 prototype. It had thicker hull armour (80 mm on the sides, 30 mm on the roof and 20 mm on the bottom). As production ramped up, quality problems emerged. Production was stopped and an improved T-54-2 (Ob'yekt 137R) version was designed. Several changes were made and a new turret was fitted. The new dome-shaped turret with flat sides was inspired by the turret from the IS-3 heavy tank; it is similar to the later T-54 turret but with a distinctive overhang at the rear. It also had a shorter bustle.

The fender machine guns were removed in favour of a single bow-mounted machine gun. The transmission was modernised and the track was widened to 580 mm. The T-54-2 entered production in 1949, at Stalin Ural Tank Factory No. 183 (Uralvagonzavod). In 1951, a second modernization was made, designated T-54-3 (Ob'yekt 137Sh), which had a new turret without side undercuts, and the new TSh-2-22 telescopic gunner's sight instead of the TSh-20. The tank featured the TDA smoke generating system. A command version was built, the T-54K (komandirskiy), with a second R-113 radio.

T-54A and T-54B

In the beginning of the 1950s, the personnel of the OKB-520 design bureau of the Stalin Ural Tank Factory No. 183 (Uralvagonzavod) had been changed considerably. Morozov was replaced by Kolesnikow, who in turn was replaced by Leonid N. Kartsev in March 1953. The first decision of the new designer was to fit the 100 mm D-10T tank gun with the STP-1 "Gorizont" vertical stabilizer. The new tank gun received the designation D-10TG and was fitted into the T-54's turret.

The new tank received night vision equipment for the driver and was designated T-54A (Ob'yekt 137G). Originally, this had a small muzzle counter-weight, which was later replaced with a fume extractor. It was equipped with an OPVT wading snorkel, the TSh-2A-22 telescopic sight, TVN-1 infrared driver's periscope and IR headlight, a new R-113 radio, multi-stage engine air filter and radiator controls for improved engine performance, an electrical oil pump, a bilge pump, an automatic fire extinguisher and extra fuel tanks.

The tank officially entered production in 1954 and service in 1955. It served as a basis for T-54AK command tank, with additional R-112 radio set (front line tanks were equipped with R-113 radio set), TNA-2 navigational device, ammunition load for the main gun decreased by 5 rounds and the AB-1-P/30 charging unit, which was produced in small numbers. In October 1954 a T-54A tank, designated as T-54M (Ob'yekt 139) served as a testbed for new D-54T and D-54TS 100 mm smoothbore guns and "Raduga" and "Molniya" stabilization systems, which were later used in the T-62. These were not completely successful, so further T-55 development continued to use the D-10 series guns. It was fitted with V-54-6 engine developing 581 hp (433 kW). It never went into production.

A new version, based on T-54A, designated T-54B (Ob'yekt 137G2), was designed in 1955. It was fitted with a new 100 mm D-10T2S tank gun with STP-2 "Tsyklon" 2-plane stabilizer. It entered production in 1957. During the last four months of production, the new tanks were equipped with an L-2 "Luna" infrared searchlight, a TPN-1-22-11 IR gunner's sight, and an OU-3 IR commander's searchlight. Modern APFSDS ammunition was developed, dramatically enhancing the penetrative performance of the gun to keep it competitive with NATO armour developments. T-54B served as the basis for T-54BK command tank, which had exactly the same additional equipment as the T-54AK command tank.

T-55

It was decided to create an NBC (nuclear, biological, and chemical) protection system which would start working 0.3 seconds after detecting gamma radiation.

The task of creating a basic PAZ (Protivoatomnaya Zashchita) NBC protection system offering protection against the blast of a nuclear weapon and (radioactive) particulate filtration, but not against external gamma radiation or gas, was given to the KB-60 design bureau in Kharkiv and was completed in 1956. The documentation was sent to Uralvagonzavod. It was decided to increase the tank's abilities by changing its construction and introducing new production technologies. Many of those changes were initially tested on the T-54M (Ob'yekt 139). 

The tank was fitted with the new V-55 12-cylinder four-stroke one-chamber, 38.88-litre water-cooled diesel engine developing 581 hp (433 kW). Engine power was increased by raising the pressure of the fuel delivery and charging degree. The designers planned to introduce a heating system for the engine compartment and MC-1 diesel fuel filter. The engine was to be started pneumatically with the use of an AK-150S charger and an electric starter. This eliminated the need for the tank to carry a tank filled with air. To allow easier access during maintenance and repairs, it was decided to change hatches over the engine compartment.

The ammunition load for the main gun was increased from 34 to 45, with 18 shells stored in so-called "wet containers" located in hull fuel tanks (the concept for which came from Kartsev's cancelled Ob'yekt 140). The TPKU commander's vision device was replaced by either the TPKUB or TPKU-2B. The gunner received a TNP-165 vision device. 

The loader's hatch-mounted 12.7 mm DShK anti-aircraft heavy machine gun was dropped, because it was deemed worthless against high-performance jets. The tank was supposed to be equipped with the "Rosa" fire protection system. The tank had a thicker turret casting and the improved two-plane gun stabilization system from the T-54B, and night vision fighting equipment. To balance the weight of the new equipment, the armour on the back of the hull was thinned slightly.

The T-55 was superior to the IS-2, IS-3, and T-10 heavy tanks in many respects, including the rate of fire of the gun (at least four compared to fewer than three rounds per minute). Despite somewhat thinner frontal turret armour ( instead of ) it compared favourably with the IS-3, due to its improved antitank gun and better mobility. Heavy tanks soon fell from favour, with only 350 IS-3s produced.

The old model of highly mobile medium tanks and heavily armoured heavy tanks was replaced by a new paradigm: the "main battle tank". Parallel developments in the West would produce similar results. Kartsev combined all the ongoing improvements being offered, or planned, on the T-54 into one design. This became the Ob'yekt 155, and entered production at Uralvagonzavod 1 January 1958 as the T-55. It was accepted for service with the Red Army on 8 May. It suffered a significant lapse in one area: there was no antiaircraft machine gun, which had been present on the T-54.

After 1959, it served as a basis for the T-55K command tank which was equipped with an additional R-112 radio set, an AB-1-P/30 fuel powered accumulator charging unit, and TPN-1-22-11 night vision sight. All this additional equipment made it necessary to decrease the ammunition load for the main gun to 37 rounds and eliminate the bow machine gun. In the beginning of the 1960s, a T-55K was experimentally fitted with a Uran TV relay apparatus for battlefield surveillance. The tank was fitted with an external camera, the picture from which was relayed to a receiver in a BTR-50PU command vehicle. There was an observation camera mounted on a folding mast which was in turn mounted on a UAZ 69 car.

In 1961, a T-55 tank was used to test the "Almaz" TV complex, which was supposed to replace the standard observation devices right after a nuclear explosion or while fording a body of water. There was a camera mounted on the hull for the driver and two cameras mounted on the turret, one for aiming and one for observation, and the picture from the cameras was relayed to two control screens. The tank had the front hull fuel tanks and bow machine gun removed. The commander was seated in the driver's usual position while the driver sat next to him. 

Because of the low quality of the equipment, the trials gave negative results. In the beginning of the 1960s, the OKB-29 design bureau in Omsk was working on adapting the tank to use a GTD-3T gas turbine engine developing 700 hp (522 kW). One T-55 tank fitted with this gas turbine engine passed trials but was deemed unsatisfactory and the design did not go into production.

The Omsk OKB-29 group tested three experimental T-55 tanks (designated Ob'yekt 612) between 1962 and 1965 that were fitted with an automatic gearbox controlled by electro-hydraulic systems. The trials found that such gearboxes were prone to frequent breakdowns in tanks. At the same time the Ob'yekt 155ML, a T-55 fitted with a launcher for three 9M14 "Malyutka" (NATO code: AT-3 Sagger) ATGMs mounted on the rear of the turret, was tested. Along with standard tanks a flamethrower-armed version was designed (designated TO-55 (Ob'yekt 482)), which was produced until 1962. It was fitted with 460-litre tanks filled with flammable liquid instead of the frontal hull fuel tanks. The flamethrower replaced the coaxial machine gun. This was a much better way to mount a flamethrower than in the experimental Ob'yekt 483, based on the T-54 tank, where the flamethrower replaced the main gun. TO-55 flamethrower tanks were withdrawn from service in 1993.

T-55A
In 1961, development of improved NBC protection systems began. The goal was to protect the crew from fast neutrons; adequate protection against gamma radiation was provided by the thick armour and a PAZ basic NBC protection system.

The POV plasticized lead antiradiation lining was developed to provide the needed protection. It was installed in the interior, requiring the driver's hatch and the coamings over the turret hatches to be noticeably enlarged. This liner had the added benefit of protecting the crew from fragments of penetrated armour.

The tank was equipped with a full PAZ/FVU chemical filtration system. The coaxial 7.62 mm SGMT machine gun was replaced by a 7.62 mm PKT machine gun. The hull was lengthened from 6.04 m to 6.2 m. The hull machine gun was removed, making space for six more main gun rounds. These changes increased the weight of the vehicle to 38 tonnes.

The design work was done by OKB-520 design bureau of Uralvagonzavod under the leadership of Leonid N. Kartsev. The T-55A served as the basis for the T-55AK command tank.

T-54/T-55 upgrades

In its long service life, the T-55 has been upgraded many times. Early T-55s were fitted with a new TSh-2B-32P sight. In 1959, some tanks received mountings for the PT-55 mine clearing system or the BTU/BTU-55 plough. In 1967, the improved 3BM-8 APDS round, which could penetrate 275 mm thick armour at a range of 2 km, was introduced. In 1970, new and old T-55 tanks had the loader's hatch modified to mount the 12.7 mm DShK machine gun, to deal with the threat of attack helicopters. Starting in 1974, T-55 tanks received the KTD-1 or KTD-2 laser rangefinder in an armoured box over the mantlet of the main gun, and the R-123 or R-123M radio set. Simultaneously, efforts were made to modernize and increase the lifespan of the drive train.

During production, the T-55A was frequently modernised. In 1965, a new track was introduced that could be used for between 2,000 km and 3,000 km, which was twice the range of the old track. It needed a new drive sprocket, with 14 teeth instead of 13. Since 1974, T-55A tanks were equipped with a KTD-1 "Newa" rangefinder and a TSzS-32PM sight. All T-55A tanks were equipped with the TPN-1-22-11 night sight. The R-113 radio set was replaced by a R-123 radio set. Late production models had rubber side skirts and a driver's windshield for use during longer stints.

T-54 and T-55 tanks continued to be upgraded, refitted, and modernised into the 1990s. Advances in armour-piercing and high-explosive anti-tank (HEAT) shaped charge ammunition would improve the gun's antitank abilities in the 1960s and 1980s.

A wide array of upgrades in different price ranges are provided by many manufacturers in different countries, intended to bring the T-54/55 up to the abilities of newer MBTs, at a lower cost. Upgrades include new engines, explosive reactive armour, new main armament such as 120 mm or 125 mm guns, active protection systems, and fire control systems with range-finders or thermal sights. These improvements make it a potent main battle tank (MBT) for the low-end budget, even to this day.

One of these upgrade packages was produced by Cadillac Gage Textron and a prototype named the Jaguar was produced. The Jaguar looked quite different from its predecessors. A newly designed turret was formed by flat armour plates installed at different angles. The hull top was new. The engine compartment and fuel tanks on the shelves over the tracks were armour-protected. The Soviet-made 100 mm gun was replaced with the American M68 105 mm rifled gun fitted with a thermal sleeve. A Marconi fire control system which was originally developed for the American light tank Stingray was fitted. The vehicle incorporated a Cadillac-Gage weapon stabilizer and gunner's sight equipped with an integral laser rangefinder. The power pack inherited by the Jaguar from the Stingray underwent only minor alterations and comprised the Detroit Diesel 8V-92TA engine and XTG-411 automatic transmission. In 1989, two Jaguar tanks were manufactured. The chassis were provided by PRC, while the hull tops, turrets and powerplants were manufactured by Cadillac Gage Textron.

Another prototype upgrade package was produced by Teledyne Continental Motors (now General Dynamics Land Systems) for the Egyptian Army and was known as the T-54E. After further modifications and trials it was sent into mass production and received the designation Ramses II.

As late as 2013, Ukrainian companies were reportedly developing T-55 main battle tank upgrades targeting the export market. The Type 59 is still in production, in several variants.

Description

The T-54 and T-55 have a cabin layout shared with many post-World War II tanks, with the fighting compartment in the front, engine compartment in the rear, and a dome-shaped turret in the center of the hull. The driver's hatch is on the front left of the hull roof. In the turret, the commander is seated on the left, with the gunner to his front and the loader on the right. The tank has a flat track, meaning no support rollers, the suspension has the drive sprocket at the rear, and dead track. Engine exhaust is on the left fender. There is a prominent gap between the first and second road wheel pairs, a distinguishing feature from the T-62, which has progressively larger spaces between road wheels towards the rear.

The T-54 and T-55 tanks are outwardly very similar and difficult to distinguish visually. Many T-54s were also updated to T-55 standards, so the distinction is often downplayed with the collective name T-54/55. Soviet tanks were factory-overhauled every 7,000 km and often given minor technology updates. Many states have added or modified the tank's equipment; India, for example, affixed fake fume extractors to its T-54s and T-55s so that its gunners would not confuse them with Pakistani Type 59s.

The older T-54 can be distinguished from the T-55 by a dome-shaped ventilator on the front right of the turret and a driver-operated SGMT 7.62 mm machine gun mounted to fire through a tiny hole in the center of the hull's front. Early T-54s lacked a gun fume extractor, had an undercut at the turret's rear, and a distinctive "pig-snout" gun mantlet.

Advantages and drawbacks
The T-54/55 tanks are mechanically simple and robust. They are very simple to operate compared to Western tanks, and do not require a high level of training or education in their crewmen. The T-54/55 is a relatively small main battle tank, presenting a smaller target for its opponents to hit. The tanks have good mobility thanks to their relatively light weight (which permits easy transport by rail or flatbed truck and allows crossing of lighter bridges), wide tracks (which give lower ground pressure and hence good mobility on soft ground), a good cold-weather start-up system and a snorkel that allows river crossings.

According to Zaloga, "By the standards of the 1950s, the T-54 was an excellent tank combining lethal firepower, excellent armour protection and good reliability" while remaining a significantly smaller and lighter tank than its NATO contemporaries—the US M48 Patton tank and the British Centurion tank. The 100 mm D-10T tank gun of the T-54 and the T-55 was also more powerful than its Western counterparts at that time (the M48 Patton initially carried a 90 mm tank gun and the Centurion Mk. 3 carried the 20-pounder (84 mm) tank gun).

This advantage lasted until the T-54 began to be countered by newer Western developments like the M60 main battle tank and upgraded Centurions and M48 Pattons using the 105 mm rifled Royal Ordnance L7 or M68 gun. Due to the lack of a sub-caliber round for the 100 mm gun, and the tank's simple fire-control system, the T-54/55 was forced to rely on HEAT ammunition to engage tanks at long range well into the 1960s, despite the relative inaccuracy of this ammunition at long ranges. The Soviets considered this acceptable for a potential European conflict, until the development of composite armour began reducing the effectiveness of HEAT warheads and kinetic energy penetrator sabot rounds were developed for the D-10T gun.

Nevertheless, T-54/55 tanks had their drawbacks. Small size is achieved at the expense of interior space and ergonomics, which causes practical difficulties, as it constrains the physical movements of the crew and slows operation of controls and equipment. This is a common trait of most Soviet tanks and hence height limits were set for certain tank crew positions in the Soviet Army, whereas other armies may not include crew member height limits as standards.

The low turret profile of the tanks prevents them from depressing their main guns by more than 5° since the breech would strike the ceiling when fired, which limits the ability to cover terrain by fire from a hull-down position on a reverse slope. As in most tanks of that generation, the internal ammunition supply is not shielded, increasing the risk that any enemy penetration of the fighting compartment could cause a catastrophic secondary explosion. The T-54 lacks NBC protection, and a turret basket, which meant that crewmen had to physically rotate and keep up with a rotating turret as the hull in which they stood didn't move with the turret. Additionally, early models also lacked gun stabilization. Most of these problems were corrected in the otherwise largely identical T-55 tank.

Together, the T-54/55 tanks have been manufactured in the tens of thousands, and many still remain in reserve, or even in front-line use among lower-technology fighting forces. Abundance and age together make these tanks cheap and easy to purchase.

Production history

Soviet Union
T-54-1 production was slow at first, as only 3 vehicles were built in 1946 and 22 in 1947. 285 T-54-1 tanks were built in 1948 by Stalin Ural Tank Factory No. 183 (Uralvagonzavod); by then it had completely replaced T-44 production at Uralvagonzavod, and Kharkiv Diesel Factory No. 75 (KhPZ). Production was stopped because of a low level of production quality and frequent breakdowns. The T-54-2 entered production in 1949 at Uralvagonzavod, which produced 423 tanks by the end of 1950. It replaced the T-34 in production at the Omsk Factory No. 183 in 1950. In 1951, over 800 T-54-2 tanks were produced. The T-54-2 remained in production until 1952. The T-54A was produced between 1955 and 1957. The T-54B was produced between 1957 and April 1959. The T-55 was produced by Uralvagonzavod between 1958 and 1962. The T-55K command tank was produced from 1959. The TO-55 (Ob'yekt 482) flamethrower tank was produced until 1962.

Overall 35,000 T-54-1, T-54-2, T-54 (T-54-3), T-54A, T-54B, T-54AK1, T-54AK2, T-54BK1 and T-54BK2 tanks were produced between 1946 and 1958 and 27,500 T-55, T-55A, T-55K1, T-55K2, T-55K3, T-55AK1, T-55AK2 and T-55AK3 tanks were produced between 1955 and 1981.

Polish People's Republic

Polish People's Republic produced 3,000 T-54, T-54A, T-54AD and T-54AM tanks between 1956 and 1964 and 7,000 T-55 (between 1964 and 1968), T-55L, T-55AD-1 and T-55AD-2 tanks (between 1968 and 1979).

Czechoslovakia
Czechoslovakia produced 2,700 T-54A, T-54AM, T-54AK, T-54AMK tanks (between 1957 and 1966) and 8,300 T-55 and T-55A tanks (between 1964 and 1983; T-55A was probably produced since 1968). Most of them were for export.

Service history

Soviet Union and Russia

The T-54/55 and the T-62 were the two most common tanks in Soviet inventory—in the mid-1970s the two tank types together comprised approximately 85% of the Soviet Army's tanks.

Soviet T-54 tanks served in combat during the Hungarian Revolution in 1956 and a few were successfully knocked out by the defending anti-Soviet Hungarian resistance-fighters and rebels using Molotov cocktails and several anti-tank guns. The local anti-communist revolutionaries delivered one captured T-54A to the British Embassy in Budapest, the analyses and studies of which helped and spurred the development of the Royal Ordnance L7 105 mm tank gun.

At the initial stage of the war in Afghanistan in 1979–1980, about 800 Soviet tanks were used, consisting of 39 battalions, mainly armed with T-54s and T-55s. In 1979, only one T-55 tank was lost. Since the beginning of 1980, they began to be replaced by modern T-62 and T-64 tanks.

The T-62 and the T-55 were auctioned off in 2012, with all Russian active-duty military units mainly operating the T-72, the T-80 and the T-90. However, T-62s were spotted in Melitopol in the 2022 Ukraine War.

Middle East

During the 1967 Six-Day War, U.S.-supplied M48 Patton tanks, British Centurion tanks, and even upgraded World War II–era Sherman tanks faced T-55s. This mix of Israeli tanks, combined with superior planning of operations and superior airpower, proved to be more than capable of dealing with the T-54/T-55 series.

During the 1970 Jordanian Civil War, Syrian tanks inflicted heavy losses on Jordanian Centurions. In one case, a squadron of T-55s stopped the advance of a large Jordanian column, with 19 Centurions destroyed and up to 10 Syrian T-55s lost in the battle. According to Israeli intelligence, Jordan lost 75 to 90 tanks out of 200 involved, most to Syrian T-55 fire  at ar-Ramtha. In turn total Syrian tank losses accounted to 62 T-55 mostly breakdowns left on enemy territory.

By the 1973 Yom Kippur War, the T-54A and T-55's gun was starting to lose its competitive effectiveness relative to the 105 mm Royal Ordnance L7 gun mounted in Israeli Centurion Mk V and M60A1 tanks. Israeli tanks fitted with the L7 105mm gun suffered greatly from the new Soviet HEAT 3BК5 ammunition fired by the T-55s.

Israel captured many from Egypt in 1967, along with a few T-55s from Syria, and kept some of them in service. They were upgraded with a 105 mm NATO-standard L7 or M68, a US version of the L7, replacing the old Soviet 100 mm D-10, and a General Motors diesel replacing the original Soviet diesel engine. The Israelis designated these Tiran-5 medium tanks, and they were used by reserve units until the early 1990s. Most of these were then sold to assorted Third World countries, some of them in Latin America, and the rest were heavily modified, converted into the Achzarit heavy armoured personnel carrier.

In the Lebanese Civil War, on 10 June 1982, eight Israeli M48A3s, two M60A1s and at least three M113 APCs were lost in an ambush by Syrian T-55 tanks and BMP-1 APCs during the Battle of Sultan Yacoub.

The tank was heavily used during the Iran–Iraq War of 1980–88. T-54/55 participated in the biggest tank battle of the war in early 1981. Iran lost 214 Chieftain and M60A1 tanks in the battle. In return, Iraq lost 45 T-55 and T-62 tanks. Another known tank battle occurred on 11 October 1980, when a large Iranian convoy supported by battalion of Chieftains (92nd Division) was ambushed by battalion of Iraqi T-55s (26th Brigade). During the battle, the Iranians lost 20 Chieftains plus other armoured vehicles and withdrew.

Many of Iraqi T-55s saw action during Operation Desert Storm in Iraq and Kuwait in January/February 1991, and during the 2003 US/UK invasion of Iraq with poor results.

Vietnam War

During the Vietnam War, the North Vietnamese Army (NVA) used T-54s, along with its Chinese-built copy (the Type 59), extensively against the South Vietnamese ARVN and their allied US forces.

The NVA and the ARVN engaged each other with tanks for the first time during Operation Lam Son 719 in February 1971. During that battle, 17 M41 Walker Bulldog light tanks of the ARVN's 1st Armoured Brigade claimed destroy 22 NVA tanks, a total of 6 T-54s and 16 PT-76 light amphibious tanks, at no loss to themselves, but their friendly units lost 5 M41s and 25 armoured personnel carriers (APCs), mainly M113 APCs.

On Easter Sunday, 2 April 1972, the newly activated 20th Tank Regiment of the ARVN, comprising approximately 57 M48A3 Patton main battle tanks (note that ARVN regiments were equivalent to US battalions, and ARVN squadrons were equivalent to US companies or troops) received reports from friendly intelligence units of a large NVA armoured column moving towards Dong Ha, the largest South Vietnamese city near the Vietnamese DMZ located on the 17th Parallel. At about noontime, the tank crewmen of the ARVN's 1st Squadron observed enemy armour moving south along Highway 1 towards Dong Ha and promptly concealed their tanks on high ground with a good vantage point against their enemy. Waiting for the NVA tank column to close to between 2500 and 3000 meters, the 90mm main guns of the Patton tanks opened fire and quickly destroyed nine PT-76s and two T-54 tanks. The surviving NVA armour, unable to locate their enemy's positions, hastily turned about and withdrew shortly afterwards.

On 9 April 1972, all three squadrons of the 20th Tank Regiment (57 M48 tanks) fought hard against enemy armour, firing upon NVA tanks accompanied by large masses of infantry, again while occupying the strategically important high ground. This time, similarly, the Pattons opened fire at approximately 2800 meters. A few answering-shots from the North Vietnamese T-54s fell short and the NVA tanks began to scatter after suffering considerable losses and heavy casualties. By the end of the day, the 20th claimed destroy sixteen T-54s and captured one Type 59 at no loss to themselves. (The NVA confirmed six tank were destroyed)

NVA armoured units equipped with the T-54 tank achieved one of their greatest victories in April 1972 when the NVA 203rd Armoured Regiment attacked the ARVN's 22nd Infantry Division based at Tân Cảnh Base Camp, which dominated a main route into the city of Kon Tum, located near the 17th Parallel. After a two-day-long intense artillery barrage, eighteen T-54 tanks from the NVA side attacked the South Vietnamese infantry camp at dawn from two different directions, thus breaking apart the ARVN unit into two and splitting up its forces, which quickly abandoned its positions and withdrew. T-54 tank No. 377 had managed to destroy seven ARVN M41s before it was finally destroyed by M72 LAW anti-tank rocket launchers fielded by the South Vietnamese infantry. The NVA destroyed 18 M41 light tanks together with 31 M113 APCs and captured 17 M41s as intact, while losing only two T-54 tanks and one PT-76 tank in the armoured skirmish.

At the very end of the Vietnam War on the 30 April 1975, an NVA T-54 tank smashed through the opulent main gate of the RVN Presidential Palace in their capital city of Saigon, accompanied by onrushing North Vietnamese troops, at the conclusion of North Vietnam's conquering of the South. This widely seen image has come to be regarded by many as perhaps the defining moment of the end of the bloody 20-year-long conflict in Vietnam, and the fall of Republic of Vietnam and the imminent end of American participation in anti-communist activities in that region of Southeast Asia. According to the Pentagon, during the 1975 Spring Offensive, the ARVN forces lost 250 M48A3 tanks, 300 M41 tanks, 1,381 M113 APCs, 1,607 guns, 200 RCL guns and 63,000 M72 LAWs.

During the Vietnam war, NVA tank units were involved in 211 battles, claimed 20,000+ enemy killed, destroyed more than 2,000 enemy tanks/APCs, 870 other military vehicles, and 3,500 enemy bunkers, and shot down 35 aircraft or helicopters, overwhelmingly using T-54s. The NVA lost an estimated 250 (1972 - 150, 1973-1975 - 100) T-54s during the war.

Following the Vietnam War, Vietnam's T-54/55s and Type 59s continued to see much combat activity against neighbouring Cambodia and China to their north between 1978 and 1979. Just like many developing countries around the world which continue to operate the T-54/55, at least 900 T-54s, along with a similar number of T-55s and Type 59s, are still in active military service with the Socialist Republic of Vietnam until the present day. Some of them are slated to be replaced by the more modern T-90S/SK.

Ogaden War
During the largest tank battle of the Ogaden War - the Battle of Jijiga (August–September 1977), 124 Somali tanks, mostly T-55s, defeated 108 Ethiopian tanks, mainly M47 Pattons and M41 Walker Bulldogs. The Ethiopians lost 43 tanks during the battle.

Angola

T-54/T-55s began appearing in Southern Africa in the late 1970s, when many emerging Marxist states, particularly Angola and Mozambique, were bolstered with modern Soviet military hardware. The T-55's dependability and ruggedness proved well-suited to the local combat environments. Survivability of opposing medium-armour vehicles deployed by UNITA and the South African Defence Force (SADF) against late model MBTs used in the Angolan Civil War remained a major concern throughout that conflict. Angolan Army T-54s were first blooded during Operation Askari, in 1981. At least five were subsequently destroyed in encounters with South African Eland or Ratel-90 armoured cars, and some were captured. Soviet sources confirm that many T-55s were penetrated by an Eland's 90 mm low-pressure gun. Nevertheless, multiple HEAT rounds were needed to guarantee sufficient damage against a T-55's frontal arc and SADF anti-tank teams forced to operate in platoons accordingly.

During the Battle of Cuito Cuanavale, another three T-55s of Angola's 21st Brigade were shot out by Ratel tank destroyers armed with ZT3 Ingwe ATGMs near the Lomba River. On 9 November 1987, an engagement between South African and Angolan tanks occurred when thirteen Olifant Mk1As eliminated two T-55s in a nine-minute skirmish. T-55s again participated in a critical engagement near Cuito Cuanavale on 14 February 1988, when Cuba's 3rd Tank Battalion counter-attacked to spare Angola's 16th Brigade virtual annihilation by 61 Mechanised Infantry Battalion Group and the 4th South African Infantry Battalion. Six T-55s were lost (three to RPGs, three to Olifants, one more was damaged), but the attack blunted the South African advance, safeguarding the cohesion of the Angolan line. Cuban and Soviet sources maintain that they destroyed ten Olifant tanks and twelve Ratels, while South African and Western sources maintain that only one Olifant and one Ratel were damaged, and one Ratel destroyed.

India and Pakistan
The Indian Army has used their T-54s and T-55s extensively in its conflicts with Pakistan between the 1970s to the 1980s. Pakistan also used some T-54As and Chinese Type 59 copies.

The first meeting of the T-55 with enemy tanks occurred in the area of Garibpur on November 22, 1971. Indian T-55 tanks (63 Cavalry) destroyed 3 Pakistani M24 Chaffee tanks (29 Cavalry)  in the area.

On December 10–11, during the Battle of Nainakot, Indian T-55s (14 Cavalry Scinde Horse) in two battles destroyed 9 Pakistani M47/48 tanks (33 Cavalry), without any loss.

Battle of Basantar or the Battle of Barapind (December 4–16, 1971) was one of the vital battles fought as part of the Indo-Pakistani War of 1971 in the western sector of India. India had destroyed close to 46 M48 tanks and losing only 10 tanks in the process.

At the end of the war, one of the last tank battles took place in the Naogaon area, an M24 company attacked Indian T-55s, but lost 5 Chaffee tanks and was forced to retreat to Bogra.

Other conflicts
T-54 tanks were used during the Cambodian Civil War and the Cambodian–Vietnamese War between the 1970s to the 1980s. During the Ugandan-Tanzanian War of 1978 to 1979, Libya sent an expeditionary military force to aid Ugandan dictator Idi Amin in his conflict with Tanzania, which included the supply of a few dozen T-54/55 tanks. Some of these tanks saw action against Tanzanian forces., with at least limited success.

Polish T-55L tanks were deployed during the imposition of martial law in their country to intimidate the population (seemingly growing ever-more anti-communist) and to suppress overt displays against their communist government.

The T-55 was the most numerous tank of the Yugoslav People's Army (JNA). It was the mainstay of armoured combat units during the Yugoslav Wars, where it proved vulnerable to infantry equipped with anti-tank rockets and weaponry and to misemployment in urban areas and unfriendly terrain. But there were too many of them in service for them to be replaced entirely. During the Battle of Vukovar, where the JNA grouped a large part of its tank force, a number were destroyed, almost exclusively by infantry-carried anti-tank weapons. The T-55 tank remained the most common tank in the armies of the various Yugoslavian successor states until recently and it was the most-used tank by all armies during the decades-long wars. T-55s were also used by Yugoslavia in the Kosovo War and in Macedonia during the 2001 insurgency in Macedonia, and by Russian peacekeepers after the withdrawal of Yugoslav forces from Kosovo. The Kosovo Liberation Army (National Liberation Army of Kosovo) captured a T-55 from the Macedonian army during the battle of Raduša.

The T-55 has been used by Ethiopia in the conflict with the Islamic Courts Union in Somalia and used by various warring factions in the Somali Civil War after the fall of the dictatorial Siad Barre regime in the 1990s.

China produced thousands of Type 59 tanks (based on the Soviet T-54A) for the People's Liberation Army, which were used during the Vietnam War and used en-masse against Vietnam in the Sino-Vietnamese War and sold the similar (but upgraded) Type 69 tanks to both Iran and Iraq during the Iran–Iraq War between 1980 and 1988. A considerable number saw action against Coalition forces during Operation Desert Storm in Iraq and Kuwait in January and February 1991 and during the US invasion of Iraq in 2003 (Operation Iraqi Freedom), with extremely poor showing against more-modern tanks fielded by US and British troops, such as the M1 Abrams and the Challenger 1 and Challenger 2 tanks.

The Sri Lanka Army used Czech T-55AM2s, heavily modernised variants of the Soviet T-55, during the Sri Lankan Civil War, which had concluded by May 2009, against the LTTE (Tamil Tigers) terrorist group. A T-55 belonging to the LTTE was destroyed by the Sri Lankan military on 6 April 2009, and according to local media reports, it was a model produced in Czechoslovakia and obtained by the LTTE in either 2001 or 2002.

T-55 tanks have seen use on both sides of the 2011 Libyan civil war, with anti-Gaddafi forces either stealing them or having them contributed by defecting members of the Libyan Army.

T-55s have been used by the Sudanese Armed Forces during the conflict in South Kordofan and Blue Nile. At least 4 were captured and 1 destroyed by the Sudan People's Liberation Movement-North on 10 December 2012.

On July 7, 2014, a T-54 from a museum in Donetsk was commissioned into the armed forces of Novorossiya.

Russia announced that several T-55 tanks used by ISIL in Syria were destroyed in an air attack conducted by its forces on October 5, 2015.

Ukrainian soldiers are training with 28 M-55S tanks, delivered in October 2022 by Slovenia. The Model M-55S is a heavily reinforced tank and has been updated with a NATO L7 105mm gun, upgraded armour protection, a digital ballistic computer, and an upgraded engine. 
In December 2022 the 28 M-55S were deployed in the volunteer 47th Assault Brigade (Ukraine)'s army.

Combat history 
 1955–1975: Vietnam War (North Vietnam)
 1956: Hungarian Revolution of 1956 (Soviet Union)
 1961–1991: Iraqi–Kurdish conflict (Iraq and Peshmerga)
 1966–1990: South African Border War (Angola)
 1967: Six-Day War (Egypt and Syria)
 1968: Warsaw Pact invasion of Czechoslovakia (Soviet Union and Poland)
 1970: Black September (Syria)
 1971: Indo-Pakistani War of 1971 (India)
 1973: Yom Kippur War (Egypt and Syria)
 1974–1991: Ethiopian Civil War (Ethiopia)
 1975–1990: Lebanese Civil War (Lebanese government forces and militias) 
 1975–1991: Western Sahara War (Morocco and Polisario)
 1975–2002: Angolan Civil War (Angola and UNITA)
 1977–1978: Ogaden War (Ethiopia, Somalia and Cuba)
 1978–1987: Chadian–Libyan conflict (Libya)
 1986–1987: Toyota War
 1978: Uganda–Tanzania War (Uganda and Libya)
 1978–1989: Cambodian–Vietnamese War (Vietnam)
 1979–1988: Soviet–Afghan War (Afghanistan and Soviet Union)
 1979: Rhodesian Bush War (Rhodesia)
 1980–1988: Iran–Iraq War (Iran and Iraq)
 1982–1983: 1982 Lebanon War (Syria and PLO)
 1983–2009: Sri Lankan Civil War (Sri Lankan government forces and LTTE)
 1983–2005: Second Sudanese Civil War (Sudanese government forces and SPLA)
 1989: Romanian Revolution (Romania)
 1988–1993: Georgian Civil War
 1991–1992: 1991–1992 South Ossetia War (Georgia)
 1992–1993: War in Abkhazia (1992–1993) (Georgia and Abkhazia)
 1990–1991: Gulf War (Iraq)
 1991–present: Somali Civil War
 1991–1995: Yugoslav Wars (Yugoslavia)
 1991: Ten-Day War (Yugoslavia)
 1991–1995: Croatian War of Independence (Yugoslavia, Croatia and Republic of Serbian Krajina)
 1992–1995: Bosnian War (Bosnia and Herzegovina and Republika Srpska)
 1994: Operation Bøllebank (Republika Srpska and UNPROFOR forces)
 1994: Yemeni Civil War (1994)
 1997: 1997 clashes in Cambodia (Cambodian government forces)
 1998–1999: Kosovo War (Army of Yugoslavia)
 1998–2000: Eritrean–Ethiopian War (Eritrea and Ethiopia)
 1998: Guinea-Bissau Civil War
 2001: 2001 insurgency in Macedonia
 2001–2021: War in Afghanistan (2001–2021) (Northern alliance and Afghanistan)
 2003–present: War in Darfur (Sudanese government forces)
 2003–2011: Iraq War
 2003: Invasion of Iraq (Iraq)
 2005–2010: Chadian Civil War (2005–2010) (Chadian government forces)
 2008: Russo-Georgian War (Abkhazia and South Ossetia)
 2011: Libyan Civil War (2011) (Gaddafi Government)
 2011–present: Syrian Civil War (Syrian government forces, ISIS and Rebels)
 2011–present: Sudanese conflict in South Kordofan and Blue Nile (Sudanese Government forces)
 2012–2013: M23 rebellion (Democratic Republic of Congo and March 23 Movement)
 2014–2017: War in Iraq (2013–2017)
 2014–2020: Libyan Civil War (2014) (Libyan National Army and Government of National Accord)
 2015–present: Yemeni Civil War (2015–present) (Hadi-government forces and Houthis)
 2020: 2020 Nagorno-Karabakh conflict (Azerbaijani Land Forces)
 2020–2022: Tigray War (Ethiopian government forces and Tigray Defense Forces)
 2022–present: 2022 Russian Invasion of Ukraine (Ukraine)

Operators and variants

The T-55 has been used worldwide by as many as 50 countries and quasi-armies. They have been subject to many improvements throughout their production history and afterward, and many are still in service today.

Modifications to the T-54/55 series over the years have changed almost every aspect of the vehicle. Initially, Soviet modifications included a better turret shape, improved NBC protection and an improved powerplant. Later, improved fire-control equipment and night-vision equipment was added.

Foreign improvements, both in Warsaw Pact nations and elsewhere, have further improved protection, powerplant, and firepower. T-54/55s have been re-armed with improved tank guns, AA machine guns, advanced armour arrays, and technologies, such as laser range finders and computerized fire control systems, that did not exist when the tank was first being built in the early days of the Cold War.

Museums with T-54/T-55 on display

There is a T-55 captured from Iraqi forces during Operation Desert Storm at USS Alabama Battleship Park, Mobile Alabama.
There is a T-55 on outdoor display at the Fort Polk Museum, Fort Polk Louisiana, United States.
The Ontario Regiment Museum has an operational T-54.
There is a T-54 outside of K-W Surplus in Kitchener, Ontario, Canada
 Museum of Military Technology "Gryf" in Gdynia, Poland offers rides in T-55A.

See also

 Al-Zarrar
 Ramses II tank
 T-54/T-55 operators and variants
 TR-85
 Type 59 tank
 Type 59G(BD) Durjoy
 Type-72Z Safir-74

Tanks of comparable role, performance and era
 Centurion tank – approximate British equivalent
 M48 Patton – approximate American equivalent

Citations

General bibliography 
 Cockburn, Andrew (1983). The Threat: Inside the Soviet Military Machine. New York: Random House. 3 May 1983 .
 Dunstan, Simon (1982). Vietnam Tracks: Armor in Battle 1945–75. Osprey Publications. .
 Foss, Christopher F., ed (2005). Jane's Armour and Artillery 2005–2006, 26th edition. 15 August 2005 .
 
 Starry, Gen. Donn A. (1989). Mounted Combat in Vietnam . Washington, D.C.: Vietnam Studies, Department of the Army. First printed in 1978-CMH Pub 90–17.
Hunnicutt, R.P. Abrams: A History of the American Main Battle Tank. Vol. 2. Presidio Press 1990.
 Hunnicutt, R. P. Patton: A History of the American Main Battle Tank. .
 Hunnicutt, R. P. Sheridan: A History of the American Light Tank Volume 2; 1995, Presidio Press. .
 
 
 James Kinnear, Stephen Sewell & Andrey Aksenov, Soviet T-54 Main Battle Tank, General Military series, Osprey Publishing Ltd, Oxford 2018. 
 James Kinnear, Stephen Sewell,  Andrey Aksenov, Soviet T-55 Main Battle Tank, General Military series, Osprey Publishing Ltd, Oxford 2019. 
Anthony Tucker-Jones, Images of War: T–54/55, The Soviet Army’s Cold War main battle tank – rare photographs from wartime archives, Pen & Sword Military, Barnsley 2017. 
 Krzysztof M. Gaj, Czołg T-55AM i pochodne (T-55AD-1M, T-55AD-2M, T-55AMS), Sowa Sp. z o.o., 2013,

External links

 Cuban T-55
 Technical data sheet and pictures T-55 from ArmyRecognition.com
 T-55 Variant walk arounds and photos on Prime Portal
 Jaguar prototype main battle tank

Main battle tanks of the Soviet Union
Cold War tanks of the Soviet Union
Main battle tanks of the Cold War
Medium tanks of the Cold War
Military vehicles introduced from 1945 to 1949